Rhode Island elected its members August 26, 1806. Rhode Island law required a majority of votes to win. In this election, only one candidate won a majority on the first ballot, and so a run-off election was required to choose the second seat.

See also 
 United States House of Representatives elections, 1806 and 1807
 List of United States representatives from Rhode Island

Notes 

1806
Rhode Island
United States House of Representatives